The Greed of Man is a Hong Kong television series first broadcast on TVB Jade in 1992. The story, spanning three decades from the 1970s to the 1990s in Hong Kong and Taiwan, addresses various social and financial phenomena of the times, from triad violence to corruption in the Hong Kong Stock Exchange. It featured a top roster cast, including veteran TVB actors Adam Cheng and Damian Lau and award-winning actor Sean Lau. The series is also well remembered for a Hong Kong stock market cultural phenomenon called the "Ting Hai effect". In 2022, the drama was selected as one of ten classic TVB dramas being honoured for a new Youku and TVB programme.

Plot
This is the first modern-age TV drama in Hong Kong history, where the story is told in reverse chronological order In medias res. The story starts at present time (in reality, the future: 7 June 1994), where The Day of Big Miracle happened, where the stock market rebounded after the market became volatile and crashed for the weekend. After the stock market stopped trading for the weekend, the Tings make the wrong bet and their entire fortune is wiped out, compounded by ending up in billions of dollars in debt. Ting Hai forces his sons to commit suicide by jumping off from the top of the stock exchange building before following suit himself, at the beginning, Ting Hai's fate was unknown.

1960-1970s
Ting Hai and Fong Chun-sun were childhood friends. Ting is a stubborn, uneducated and pathologically self-righteous brute who imagines himself to be a living kong-woo hero, while Fong is an honest, cultured and refined leader of the Asian Stock Exchange. Fong is pressured by some of the most powerful and corrupt bureaucrats in Hong Kong to control the stock market. Immigration officers, police chiefs and government officials all attempt to cash in. Fong manipulates the market such that no one could touch him. The stock guru Yip Tin describes the event as a battle to seize control of the "Mandate of Heaven".

Fong develops strong feelings for Ting's girlfriend Lo Wei-ling, and becomes Ting's rival for her affection. In a fit of fury over Lo's disaffection, Ting cripples Fong, and later, during an ill-advised attempt at reconciliation, kills him. Without Fong's moderating influence, the 1973 stock market crash forces many people into extreme poverty, including Fong and his family. Stock manipulation is one justification for the creation of the Hong Kong Independent Commission Against Corruption (ICAC) in February 1974.

1980s
Ting Hai flees to Taiwan, where his unabatedly violent behaviour lands him a 14-year prison sentence. Back in Hong Kong, Ting's four sons manage to build a powerful triad in their father's absence. The four brothers blame the Fong family for separating them from their father, and they harass them unrelentingly. The eldest son, Ting How-hai, replays his father's relationship with Lo Wei-ling on one of the Fong sisters, and is driven to violence when she rejects him. Ting Hai returns to Hong Kong and is convicted of murder, but is pardoned using a forged certification of terminal illness. All of Fong Chun-sun's three daughters are brutally killed, while Fong's only son, Fong Chin-bok, manages to survive and escape to Taiwan. With help from his two girlfriends, Fong strikes a fortune by gambling on the stock market (not by investing, but via an indirect gambling method) and returns to Hong Kong to avenge his family. At the same time, the Ting family's wealth and power have increased to incredible proportions via the stock market due to sheer luck in the 1987 bear market.

1990s
The final showdown between the Tings and Fongs is inspired by the backdrop of a war in the Middle East in 1994. Fong Chin-bok's investment company faces the Ting family in a winner-takes-all, last-man-standing stock market epic battle. To raise the stakes, the Tings are financed by international criminal syndicates. Fong wins the support of three of Hong Kong's wealthiest tycoons, who want to return the favour as they built their financial empires with help from Fong's father back in the 1960s. The stock market rises and falls correspondingly with news of American forces entering or withdrawing from the war. Eventually, the Tings make the wrong bet and their entire fortune is wiped out, compounded by ending up in billions of dollars in debt. Ting Hai forces his sons to commit suicide by jumping off from the top of the stock exchange building before following suit himself, but he survives and spends the rest of his life in prison.

Cast

Ting family

Fong family

Others

Reception 
The first episode of The Greed of Man starts in medias res with Ting Hai hurling his four adult sons from the top of the stock exchange building after losing his fortunes in the stock market. Upon the show's initial run in 1992, the audience found the scene so disturbing that the resulting torrent of complaints forced TVB to make several adjustments to the programme. The drama was moved from the 7 o'clock timeslot to the 9 o'clock timeslot after the first week of airing, and several sensitive scenes were cut. Scenes that have been edited out include Ting Hai trying to wash blood off his hands with his own urine, the rape and suicide of Fong Man, and the triads throwing the remnants of the Fong family down from the roof. No domestic version, including later reruns and VHS and DVD releases, contains the full unedited The Greed of Man; however, the North American VHS version, being shipped before the programme was aired and edited in Hong Kong, is considered to be the complete uncut version.

The April 2015 rerun, aired after a massive spike in the Hang Seng Index, drew an average of 360,000 viewers, a record for late night television in Hong Kong. The controversial opening scene itself drew 410,000 viewers. Young viewers watching the classic soap opera for the first time dubbed it a "divine drama" (神劇, meaning a highly acclaimed drama) on social media. The rerun won the "Most Popular Classic Drama Serial" award in the 2015 TVB Anniversary Awards.

Legacy

Ting Hai effect

The series, which centers on the bustling stock market during the early 1990s, has been studied by international stockbrokers for its peculiar effect on the global stock market trend. A phenomenon is observed, that whenever a television drama starring Adam Cheng, the actor for the character Ting Hai, is aired, the stock market will drop for unexplainable reasons. In 1992 when the series made its debut, the Hong Kong stock market dropped by 1200 points in one month. In 2009 when Cheng starred in The King of Snooker, the Hang Seng Index fell by 600 points again.

The actual "Day of Miracle" 
Because the ending date of the drama was set in the future, in 1994, when it did happen, the stock market was also in the middle of a skid.

The "Days of Miracle" happened of sorts on 4 January 1994, Heng Seng Index closed on a then-historical high of 12,201, by 23 January, it fell to 6967.5, almost halving the value. On 7 June 1994, the day of the fictional miracle, Heng Seng Index closed at 9,247.9, down 135.1 from the Friday before (4 June, at 9,383).

Others
Sean Lau's character Fong Chin-bok was involved in a love triangle with Yuen Mui and Long Kei-man, played respectively by Vivian Chow and Amy Kwok. Fong married Yuen eventually in the series before she was presumed dead from her heart conditions, but in reality, Lau dated Kwok and married her in 1998, and they were encouraged by Chow to become a couple after the filming. Amy Kwok has not been acting since 2006.

Yammie Lam, who played Lo Wei-ling, became mentally unstable like her character in the series. The Hong Kong media has since speculated that she has been possessed and cannot get out of her role. In September 1998, Lam lost control of her car while driving at Repulse Bay, and was admitted into hospital. Her mental illness was announced in the following year. She alleged to be sexually harassed by two renowned seniors in the industry, and was found dead on 3 November 2018, having died a few days prior. She was killed from slipping in the bathroom in her flat in Stanley, Hong Kong.

Future film director Derek Kwok was so inspired by a quote spoken by the actor Law Lok-lam in episode 8 that he quit his original job as a graphic designer and started to study screenwriting in order to become a director.

Sequel
In 2000, TVB's rival station ATV produced Divine Retribution, as a sequel to The Greed of Man. Both its Chinese and English titles, as well as its characters, were modified to avoid association with The Greed of Man. It was directed by Wai Ka-fai and featured Adam Cheng and Sean Lau.

See also
 1973–74 stock market crash
 Hang Seng Index
 The Wolf of Wall Street
 Wall Street (1987 film)
 Overheard (film)

References

External links

 The Greed of Man Spcnet.tv reviews

TVB dramas
1992 Hong Kong television series debuts
1992 Hong Kong television series endings
1990s Hong Kong television series
Financial thrillers
Serial drama television series
Television series set in the 1960s
Television series set in the 1970s
Television series set in the 1980s
Television series set in the 1990s
Cantonese-language television shows
Triad (organized crime)